This is a list of the mammal species recorded in Bahrain. Of the seven mammal species in Bahrain, two are considered vulnerable.

The following tags are used to highlight each species' conservation status as assessed by the International Union for Conservation of Nature:

Order: Sirenia (manatees and dugongs) 

Sirenia is an order of fully aquatic, herbivorous mammals that inhabit rivers, estuaries, coastal marine waters, swamps, and marine wetlands. All four species are endangered.
Family: Dugongidae
Genus: Dugong
Dugong, D. dugon

Order: Lagomorpha (rabbits and hares) 
While they may appear to be rodents, rabbits and hares belong in their own family, the lagomorphs.
Family: Leporidae
Genus: Lepus
Cape hare, L. capensis

Order: Chiroptera (bats) 

The bats' most distinguishing feature is that their forelimbs are developed as wings, making them the only mammals capable of flight. Bat species account for about 20% of all mammals.
Family: Vespertilionidae
Genus: Rhyneptesicus
Sind bat, R. nasutus

Order: Rodentia (rodents) 

Rodents make up the largest order of mammals, with over 40% of mammalian species. They have two incisors in the upper and lower jaw which grow continually and must be kept short by gnawing.

Suborder: Myomorpha
Family: Muridae (mice, rats, gerbils, etc.)
Genus: Gerbillus
 Cheesman's gerbil, G. cheesmani 
 Wagner's gerbil, G. dasyurus 
 Dwarf gerbil, G. nanus 
Genus: Meriones
 Sundevall's jird, M. crassus 
Genus: Mus
 House mouse, M. musculus

Order: Eulipotyphla (shrews and hedgehogs) 

Eulipotyphla comprises the hedgehogs and gymnures (family Erinaceidae, formerly also the order Erinaceomorpha) and true shrews (family Soricidae).

Family: Erinaceidae (hedgehogs)
Subfamily: Erinaceinae
Genus: Paraechinus
 Desert hedgehog, P. aethiopicus 
Family: Soricidae (shrews)
Subfamily: Crocidurinae
Genus: Suncus
 Etruscan shrew, S. etruscus 
 House shrew, S. murinus

Order: Cetacea (whales) 

The order Cetacea includes whales, dolphins and porpoises. They are the mammals most fully adapted to aquatic life with a spindle-shaped nearly hairless body, protected by a thick layer of blubber, and forelimbs and tail modified to provide propulsion underwater.

Suborder: Mysticeti
Family: Balaenopteridae
Subfamily: Balaenopterinae
Genus: Balaenoptera
 Bryde's whale, B. edeni 
Subfamily: Megapterinae
Genus: Megaptera
Humpback whale, M. novaeangliae 
Suborder: Odontoceti
Superfamily: Platanistoidea
Family: Phocoenidae
Genus: Neophocaena
 Finless porpoise, N. phocaenoides 
Family: Delphinidae (marine dolphins)
Genus: Grampus
 Risso's dolphin, G. griseus 
Genus: Lagenodelphis
 Fraser's dolphin, L. hosei 
Genus: Orcinus
 Orca, O. orca 
Genus: Sousa
 Indo-Pacific humpback dolphin, S. chinensis 
 Indian Ocean humpbacked dolphin, S. plumbea 
Genus: Stenella
 Pantropical spotted dolphin, S. attenuata 
 Spinner dolphin, S. longirostris 
Genus: Steno
 Rough-toothed dolphin, S. bredanensis 
Genus: Tursiops
 Indo-Pacific bottlenose dolphin, T. aduncus 
 Common bottlenose dolphin, T. truncatus

Order: Carnivora (carnivorans) 

There are over 260 species of carnivorans, the majority of which feed primarily on meat. They have a characteristic skull shape and dentition. 
Suborder: Feliformia
Family: Herpestidae (mongooses)
Genus: Urva
 Indian grey mongoose, U. edwardsii

Order: Artiodactyla (even-toed ungulates) 

The even-toed ungulates are ungulates whose weight is borne about equally by the third and fourth toes, rather than mostly or entirely by the third as in perissodactyls. There are about 220 artiodactyl species, including many that are of great economic importance to humans.

Family: Bovidae (cattle, antelope, sheep, goats)
Subfamily: Antilopinae
Genus: Gazella
 Arabian sand gazelle, G. marica 
Subfamily: Hippotraginae
Genus: Oryx
 Arabian oryx, O. leucoryx  introduced

See also
List of chordate orders
Lists of mammals by region
Mammal classification

Notes

References
 

Lists of mammals by country
Lists of mammals of the Middle East
mammals

mammals